Kübra Berber (born April 14, 1996, in Gölcük, Kocaeli, Turkey) is a Turkish women's football defender currently playing in the First League for Ataşehir Belediyespor with jersey number 6. She is a member of the Turkish national U-19 team since 2013.

Career

Club

She received her license on June 10, 2008, for her hometown club Gölcükspor. Berber played three seasons, capped 46 times and scored two goals for Gölcükspor in the Turkish Women's Second Football League. In the 2011–12 season, she transferred to Derince Belediyespor. At the end of the season, she enjoyed her team's promotion to the Women's First League.

She was transferred by the Second League-team 1207 Antalyaspor following her club's withdraw from the league in the 2014–15 season. She enjoyed league championship with 1207 Antalyaspor and promotion to the Women's First League.

In the 2018–19 league season, she transferred to Ataşehir Belediyespor.

International
Kübra Berber appeared twice in the TurKey girls' national U-15 team and capped 14 times for the Turkey U-17 before she was called up for the Turkey U-19.

On November 26, 2014, Berber debuted in the Turkey women's national under-21 football team playing in the friendly match against Belgium.

Career statistics
.

Honours
 Turkish Women's First League
 Derince Belediyespor
 Third places (1): 2013–14.

 Turkish Women's Second League
 1207 Antalyaspor
 Winners (1): 2014–15

References

External links

 
 

Living people
1996 births
People from Gölcük
Turkish women's footballers
Women's association football defenders
Turkey women's international footballers
Gölcükspor players
Derince Belediyespor women's players
1207 Antalya Spor players
Kireçburnu Spor players
Ataşehir Belediyespor players